Mjuken or Nuken is a hill on the island of Stora Kalsøy in the municipality of Austevoll in Vestland county, Norway. The village of Bakkasund lies south of the hill.

See also
List of mountains of Norway

References

Austevoll
Mountains of Vestland